The Lepki–Murkim languages are a pair to three recently discovered languages of New Guinea, Lepki, Murkim and possibly Kembra.

Øystein Lund Andersen has written an ethnography sketch on the Lepki that includes a wordlist of Lepki language and songs.

Classification
In 2007, on a  Papuan language website, Mark Donohue reported that,
Murkim [and] Lepki [and] Kembra are, along with a number of other languages, unclassified groups living between the main cordillera and Mt. 6234, in the north of Papua near the PNG border (where 'near' = up to about 6 days' walk). They don't appear to be related to each other, based on wordlists, and they don't appear to show external affiliations.

However, Søren Wichmann (2013) found that Murkim and Lepki at least appear to be very closely related,
a position accepted by Glottolog.
Usher (2018) classifies the three languages in the southern branch of the Pauwasi family. Foley (2018) classifies them separately as an independent language family. Foley (2018) also classifies Kembra and Kembra as isolates, but does not exclude the possibility of their being related to Lepki–Murkim.

Basic vocabulary
Basic vocabulary of Lepki and Murkim showing cognates and non-cognates listed in Foley (2018):

{| 
|+ Lepki family basic vocabulary
! gloss !! Lepki !! Murkim
|-
| ‘bird’ || afai || afi
|-
| ‘blood’ || yiri || mal
|-
| ‘bone’ || kɔw || kok
|-
| ‘breast’ || nom || mam
|-
| ‘ear’ || bwi || bwi
|-
| ‘eat’ || ɲis || ɲẽlo
|-
| ‘egg’ || haiden || nel
|-
| ‘eye’ || yɛmon || amol
|-
| ‘fire’ || yaɣala || yo
|-
| ‘give’ || ken o || knewo
|-
| ‘go’ || aːro || haro
|-
| ‘ground’ || tɛtɛp || andok
|-
| ‘hair’ || yɛt || (inok-)ʔtair
|-
| ‘hear’ || ofa o || fao
|-
| ‘I’ || aro || nuːk
|-
| ‘leg’ || kol || ba
|-
| ‘louse’ || nɪm || im
|-
| ‘man’ || rawil || frawil
|-
| ‘moon’ || roɣivei || kaya(bi)
|-
| ‘name’ || gye || ka ~ kako
|-
| ‘one’ || kutuɣap || hel
|-
| ‘road, path’ || masin || mesain
|-
| ‘see’ || boɣo || bowo
|-
| ‘sky’ || yiris ilaɣo || smomya
|-
| ‘stone’ || sauf || oːn
|-
| ‘sun’ || mom || kayakalo
|-
| ‘tongue’ || braw || prouk
|-
| ‘tooth’ || kal || kal
|-
| ‘tree’ || ya || yamul
|-
| ‘two’ || kaisi || kais
|-
| ‘water’ || kel || kel
|-
| ‘we’ || yiris || nakmere
|-
| ‘woman’ || konan || wonak
|-
| ‘you (sg)’ || yoyo || hak(o)
|}

References

 
Lepki-Murkim